I Got Lucky is a compilation album by American singer and musician Elvis Presley.  The album, released in October 1971 on the RCA Camden label, is a follow-up to the C'mon Everybody album as it features the remaining tracks from the soundtrack EPs (previously unissued on LP) of the same four films from the first compilation plus one non-movie/non-LP track. It was certified Gold on January 6, 2004 and Platinum on September 15, 2011 by the RIAA.

Track listing

References

External links

1971 compilation albums
Elvis Presley compilation albums
RCA Camden compilation albums